St Malachy's GAA may refer to:

Edendork St Malachy's GAC, a sports club
Moortown St Malachy's GAC, a sports club

See also
Armagh Harps GFC, a descendant of a sports club named St Malachy's which existed in the 1940s
Castledawson GAC, a sports club occasionally referred to as St Malachy's
Castlewellan GAC, a sports club occasionally referred to as St Malachy's